Lake Delano is a reservoir within the F. D. Roosevelt State Park, in Harris County, Georgia.

There are a number of conflicting information, but the lake is officially Lake Delano.  Per official Georgia State Park website:

"2 Lakes (15-acre Lake Delano and 25-acre Lake Franklin)"[3]

Lake Delano was named after Sara Roosevelt, the presidential mother. A variant name is "Delano Lake".

References

Delano
Bodies of water of Harris County, Georgia